Joe McElholum (6 April 1910 – 15 August 1998) was an Australian rules footballer who played with North Melbourne in the Victorian Football League (VFL).

McElohum later served in the Australian Army for three years during World War II.

Notes

External links 

Joe McElholum's playing statistics from The VFA Project

1910 births
1998 deaths
Australian rules footballers from Victoria (Australia)
North Melbourne Football Club players
Yarraville Football Club players